Ultimate Collection is a Contemporary Christian greatest hits album of Worship music by renowned artist Don Moen and was released on March 5, 2013, by Integrity and Columbia, which contains best songs written by Moen from his previous albums that have sold over five million units.

Track listing

Credits
Tom Brooks – Music producer
C. Ryan Dunham – Executive producer
David Hamilton – Music producer
Paul Mills – Music producer
Steve Merkel – Producer, Compiler
Don Moen – Artist, Music producer
Ted Skolits – Mastering
Dave Taylor – Project coordinator

References

Don Moen albums
2013 greatest hits albums